The Soviet Union (USSR) competed at the 1968 Winter Olympics in Grenoble, France.

Medalists

Alpine skiing

Men

Men's slalom

Women

Biathlon

Men

Men's 4 x 7.5 km relay

Cross-country skiing

Men

Men's 4 × 10 km relay

Women

Women's 3 x 5 km relay

Figure skating

Men

Women

Pairs

Ice hockey

Medal round 

 USSR –  Finland 8:0  (3:0, 2:0, 3:0)
Goalscorers: Staršinov 2, Mišakov 2, Zimin 2, Firsov, Polupanov. 
Referees: Bucala, Kořínek (TCH)

 USSR –  East Germany 9:0  (4:0, 2:0, 3:0)
Goalscorers: Firsov 3, Vikulov 2, Mishakov, Starshinov, Alexandrov, Zaytsev.
Referees: Wycisk (POL), Johannessen (NOR)

 USSR –  USA 10:2  (6:0, 4:2, 0:0) 
Goalscorers: Firsov 3, Blinov 2, Polupanov 2, Kuzkin, Starshinov, Moiseyev– Ross, Morrison. 
Referees: Dahlberg (SWE), Kubinec (CAN)

 USSR –  West Germany  9:1  (4:1, 4:0, 1:0) 
Goalscorers: Polupanov 2, Alexandrov 2, Ionov, Starshinov, Majorov, Moiseyev, Firsov – Funk. 
Referees: Trumble (USA), Valentin (AUT)

 USSR –   Sweden  3:2  (1:1, 0:0, 2:1)
Goalscorers: Firsov 2, Blinov – Öberg, Svedberg.
Referees: Kubinec (CAN), Kořínek (TCH)

 Czechoslovakia –  USSR 5:4  (3:1, 1:1, 1:2)   
Goalscorers: Ševčík, Hejma, Havel, Golonka, Jiřík – Majorov 2, Blinov, Polupanov.
Referees: Trumble (USA), Dahlberg (SWE)

 USSR –  Canada 5:0  (1:0, 1:0, 3:0)
Goalscorers: Firsov 2, Mishakov, Starshinov, Zimin.
Referees: Trumble (USA), Dahlberg (SWE)

Roster
 USSR
Goaltenders: Viktor Konovalenko, Viktor Zinger.
Defence: Viktor Blinov, Vitalij Davidov, Viktor Kuzkin, Alexandr Ragulin, Oleg Zaytsev, Igor Romiševskij.
Forwards: Anatolij Firsov, Vyacheslav Starshinov, Viktor Polupanov, Vladimir Vikulov, Venjamin Alexandrov, Yury Moiseyev, Yevgeni Mishakov, Yevgeni Zimin, Anatoly Ionov, Boris Majorov. 
Coaches: Arkadij Černyšev, Anatolij Tarasov.

Nordic combined 

Events:
 normal hill ski jumping 
 15 km cross-country skiing

Ski jumping

Speed skating

Men

Women

References

Official Olympic Reports
International Olympic Committee results database
 Olympic Winter Games 1968, full results by sports-reference.com

Nations at the 1968 Winter Olympics
1968
Winter Olympics